is Pink Lady's 19th single release, and was released on May 21, 1980. This song was a Japanese version of "Strangers When We Kiss", a song which they recorded for their American debut album Kiss in the Dark.

On September 1, 1980, the duo held a press conference to announce their disbandment by March 1981, as well as the release of their four final singles. "Utakata" was the first of these four to be released after the announcement.

The song sold 250,000 copies.

Track listing (7" vinyl) 
All lyrics are written by Noriko Miura; all arrangement by Makoto Kawaguchi.

Chart positions

References

External links
 
 

1980 singles
1980 songs
Pink Lady (band) songs
Japanese-language songs
Disco songs
Victor Entertainment singles